Level Mountain is a large volcanic complex in the Northern Interior of British Columbia, Canada. The lower, broader half of Level Mountain consists of a shield-like structure while its upper half has a more steep, jagged profile. Its broad summit is dominated by the Level Mountain Range, a small mountain range with prominent peaks cut by deep valleys. These valleys serve as a radial drainage for several small streams that flow from the mountain. Meszah Peak is the only named peak in the Level Mountain Range.

The mountain began forming about 15 million years ago and has experienced volcanism up until geologically recent times. There have been four stages of activity throughout the long volcanic history of Level Mountain. The first stage commenced 14.9 million years ago with the eruption of voluminous lava flows; these created a large shield volcano. The second stage began 7.1 million years ago to form a structurally complicated stratovolcano located centrally atop the shield. A series of lava domes was established during the third stage, which began 4.5 million years ago. This was followed by the fourth and final stage with the eruption of lava flows and small volcanic cones in the last 2.5 million years. A wide range of rock types were produced during these stages, namely ankaramites, alkali basalts, trachybasalts, mugearites, hawaiites, phonolites, trachytes and rhyolites. Alkali basalts and ankaramites are the most voluminous and form most of Level Mountain. The remaining rock types are less extensive and are largely restricted to the central region of the volcanic complex. Several types of volcanic eruptions produced these rocks.

Level Mountain lies in one of many ecoregions encompassing British Columbia. It can be ecologically divided into three sections: lodgepole pine and white spruce forests at its base, bog birch and subalpine fir forests on its flanks, and an alpine climate at its summit. The extent and flatness of the alpine on Level Mountain have produced many Arctic affinities that are particularly noticeable in the local biota. Several animal species thrive in the area of Level Mountain, caribou being the most abundant. A trading post was established at Level Mountain in the 1890s, followed by geological studies of the mountain from the 1920s onwards. This remote area of Cassiar Land District has a relatively dry environment compared to the Coast Mountains in the west. Due to its remoteness, Level Mountain can only be accessed by air or by trekking great distances on foot.

Geology

Background
Level Mountain is part of the Northern Cordilleran Volcanic Province (NCVP), a broad area of volcanoes extending from northwestern British Columbia northwards through Yukon into easternmost Alaska. Volcanism in this geologic province can be traced as far back as 20 million years ago with the emplacement of alkali basalt in western Yukon. Several types of volcanic eruptions have since created different landforms across the NCVP, including shield volcanoes, lava domes, stratovolcanoes and cinder cones. Other volcanic landforms, notably subglacial volcanoes, take their shape from the environment they formed in regardless of the type of magma they produced. The NCVP contains more than 100 volcanoes and is the most volcanically active area in Canada; eruptions are expected to occur there roughly every 100 years.

Level Mountain is part of the Stikine Subprovince of the NCVP. This subprovince, confined to the Stikine region of northwestern British Columbia, consists of three other volcanic complexes: Heart Peaks, Hoodoo Mountain and Mount Edziza. All four complexes differ petrologically and/or volumetrically from the rest of the NCVP. Heart Peaks, Level Mountain and Mount Edziza are the largest NCVP centres by volume, the latter two of which have experienced volcanism for a much longer timespan than any other NCVP centre. Level Mountain, Hoodoo Mountain and Mount Edziza are the only NCVP centres that contain volcanic rocks of both mafic and intermediate to felsic composition.

Like other NCVP centres, Level Mountain has its origins in rifting of the North American Plate caused by crustal extension. This has resulted from the Pacific Plate sliding northward along the Queen Charlotte Fault, on its way to the Aleutian subduction zone in Alaska. As the continental crust stretches, the near surface rocks fracture along steeply dipping faults parallel to the rift. Mafic magma rises along these fractures to create fluid lava flows, although more viscous felsic magma also makes its way to the surface and can produce explosive eruptions. Two major structural features, the Tintina and Denali–Coast fault systems, run parallel with the NCVP. Both structures have had strike-slip motions since the Cretaceous period, which has resulted in several hundred kilometres of crustal displacement.

Structure
Level Mountain comprises two principal components: a voluminous basal shield volcano and an overlying eroded stratovolcano. It consists of four distinctive stratigraphic units comprising thin mafic lava flows. The shield volcano forms a broad, oval-shaped, north–south trending lava plateau on which local streams flow. The south and west sides of the plateau are marked by a well-defined but dissected escarpment. In contrast, the north and east plateau boundaries are less clear. From an elevation of  onwards the overlying stratovolcano is dominant. Therefore, when viewed from a distance, Level Mountain appears unusually flat except for a number of black peaks on its summit which have the appearance of enormous volcanic cones.

Level Mountain is the largest NCVP centre with respect to both volume and area covered. Because of Level Mountain's great extent it can be seen from outer space. This, coupled with elevation and snow, helps define the geology of the region. Level Mountain lies on the Nahlin Plateau, a subdivision of the larger Stikine Plateau that is dominated by the complex. The basement of the shield consists largely of felsic igneous rocks comprising northern Stikinia, but sedimentary rocks are also present below the lava plateau escarpment. Two major northwest trending faults straddle Level Mountain, both of which were active during the Mesozoic and Cenozoic eras. The King Salmon Fault forms a geological boundary between island arc rocks of Stikinia and seafloor rocks of the Cache Creek Terrane. Paleozoic to Mesozoic rocks are exposed in the hanging wall of this thrust fault and are intensely cleaved, particularly near the sole of the thrust. The other planar fracture, Nahlin, is an east-dipping thrust fault extending several hundred kilometres from northern British Columbia into southern Yukon.

Several rock types with varying chemical compositions make up Level Mountain. Ankaramites and alkali basalts are the main volcanic rocks comprising the basal shield. Alkali basalts form columnar-jointed lava flows, vesicular lava flows, dikes and scoria while ankaramites are present as dark-coloured lava flows with several columnar cooling units. Trachybasalts, phonolites, trachytes, peralkaline trachytes, rhyolites and peralkaline rhyolites (e.g. pantellerites and comendites) form the overlying stratovolcano and domes. They comprise dikes, welded tuffs, pitchstones, volcanic plugs, laccoliths and flows. Trachybasalts are in the form of two textural types: phenocryst-rich lava flows and fragmental flow agglomerates. Phonolites are vesicular and pumiceous in nature, although phonolites with trachytic texture are also present. Trachytes and peralkaline trachytes are the main volcanic rocks in the Level Mountain Range. Rhyolites are in the form of stubby lava flows and domes. Comendites appear to have erupted more fluidly, forming lava tubes.

This evidence indicates that much of the mountain was covered by ice during past glacial periods; the latest glacial period ended approximately 12,000 years ago. A series of U-shaped valleys have been carved into Level Mountain by radially directed alpine glaciers. These serve as a radial drainage for at least six small streams: Dudidontu, Kakuchuya, Beatty, Lost, Kaha and Little Tahltan. Those that flow from the Level Mountain Range drain across the lava plateau in a pinwheel-like fashion; Kakuchuya and Dudidontu contain a series of small lakes. The Kakuchuya and Beatty creek valleys have been eroded to a level below that of the plateau surface. Another stream, Matsatu, has cut a large steep-sided gorge into the western escarpment of Level Mountain. Also dissecting the mountain are V-shaped stream canyons along the lava plateau margin, exposing a section of Tertiary basalts along the Grand Canyon of the Stikine. Cryoturbation takes place mainly on flat and gently sloping areas while stone striping happens primarily on gently sloping areas adjacent to peaks of the Level Mountain Range. Some of the steeper slopes of the Level Mountain Range are confined to nivation and solifluction. Snow avalanches are limited only to the Level Mountain Range and the steepest slopes.

Extensive tectonic uplift occurred at Level Mountain and elsewhere on the Stikine Plateau during the Neogene period. This resulted in dissection of the plateau surface by stream erosion which varies greatly across the region. The youthful V-shaped gorges along the lava plateau margin of Level Mountain are signs of continuing uplift, which may in part be caused by doming of the complex during volcanism. Several outcrops of alkali basalt exist south of Kennicott Lake and the Tahltan River. They are comparable in age to the Level Mountain shield volcano and may represent erosional remnants of this structure.

Volcanic history
Level Mountain has experienced volcanic eruptions sporadically for the last 15 million years, making it the most persistent eruptive centre of the NCVP. It has been the site of volcanic activity throughout much of the existence of the NCVP, correlating with changes in the regional tectonics. Volcanism at Level Mountain initially correlated with net compression across the North American and Pacific plates. However, new active plate motions between the two tectonic plates about 10 million years ago generated extensional stresses across the NCVP, resulting in lithospheric thinning and decompression melting of OIB-like mantle to produce alkaline Neogene magmatism. The main structural evidence for Neogene extension in the NCVP is the Mess Lake fault, which reaches the southwestern extent of Level Mountain. A return to net compression across the North American and Pacific plate boundaries commenced about four million years ago. Magmatism since then has most likely resulted from a continuation of asthenospheric upwelling and local transtension along the two tectonic plates. Evidence for magmatic activity having originated from the upper mantle include the existence of olivine, orthopyroxene and spinel xenocrysts in Level Mountain basalt.

More than 20 eruptive centres are present on the summit and flanks of Level Mountain. These have produced mainly felsic and mafic lavas, a chemical composition range typical of bimodal volcanism. Like several other volcanic centres in northern British Columbia, Level Mountain was volcanically active during past glacial periods. Its involvement with glaciation resulted in several interactions between magma and ice, affording multiple examples of glaciovolcanic processes. Evidence for contemporaneous volcanism and glaciation is widespread throughout the mountain. This includes interlayered unconsolidated fluvioglacial and tuffaceous deposits, tills and glacial erratics at the base of tuffs and lava flows, lahars composed of till and agglomerate, tuyas on the uppermost surface of the shield and as outliers, till cemented by siliceous sinter, and the presence of freshwater pillow basalts and volcano-glacial tuff breccias. It is possible that geothermal outputs at Level Mountain had an influence on dynamics of past ice sheets much like the modern Grímsvötn caldera is an important heat source beneath Vatnajökull in Iceland. However, like other large volcanic centres in the NCVP, much of Level Mountain was formed prior to glaciation. Hiatuses of up to a million years or more can be expected between periods of volcanic activity at Level Mountain.

Initial volcanism of the NCVP 20 million years ago was sporadic, producing small volumes of material. This stage of volcanism ended 6.9 million years ago with completion of the basal shield volcano. A second stage of volcanism occurred at Level Mountain 7.1 to 5.3 million years ago with construction of the overlying stratovolcano. Dome-forming eruptions were dominant during the third eruptive stage 4.5 to 2.5 million years ago, during which time a magmatic lull appears to have been present throughout the NCVP. A fourth and final stage of volcanism at Level Mountain commenced in the last 2.5 million years with the formation of minor volcanic cones and lava flows. Modern NCVP volcanism rates are much less than those estimated for Hawaii or the Cascade Volcanic Arc of western North America.

Mafic shield-building stage
The mafic shield-building stage began with the eruption of thin mafic lava flows over an erosion surface. Successive eruptions sent lava pouring in all directions from central vents, forming a broad, gently sloping volcano of flat, domical shape, with a profile much like that of a warrior's shield. Alkali basalts and ankaramites were the main lavas produced during this stage of activity which, due to their low silica content, were able to travel great distances away from their source. These lavas also erupted from vents on the flanks of the volcano. Blocky 'a'a and ropy pāhoehoe flows characterized the fluid and effusive nature of volcanism during this stage.

Lava flows of the mafic shield-building stage comprise four sub-horizontal units. Initial volcanism produced a  sequence of columnar-jointed alkali basalt flows and altered grey-green vesicular basalts which form the lowest unit. Subsequent activity deposited the overlying second  unit. This comprises up to seven  columnar cooling units of alkali basalt separated by buff-weathered vesicular lava flows. Renewed volcanism deposited a  sequence of massive ankaramite lava flows over the second unit. These lava flows, comprising the third unit, are spheroidally weathered. The mafic shield-building stage culminated with the emplacement of the fourth and highest unit. All four sub-horizontal units were deposited over a timespan of six million years.

Bimodal stratovolcano stage

After the basal shield volcano was constructed, several vents produced peralkaline, metaluminous, supersaturated and undersaturated lavas. This tremendous variation in the erupted magmas and influence of adjacent vents gave rise to a high and voluminous bimodal stratovolcano located centrally atop the shield. Volcanic rocks of felsic composition, notably peralkaline trachyte and comendite, were the main products comprising this structure, forming more than 80% of its volume. Explosive eruptions during this stage of activity deposited basalt agglomerates, ash fall and ash flow tuffs.

Peralkalinity had remarkable effects on lava morphology and mineralogy during the bimodal stratovolcano stage. A unique characteristic of the peralkaline felsic lava flows produced during this stage of activity is that although they were high in silica content, the flows were overly fluid in nature. This is because the peralkaline content decreased the viscosity of the flows a minimum of 10–30 times over that of calc-alkaline felsic flows. As a result of this fluidity, the peralkaline felsic lava flows were able to form small-scale folds and  lava tubes. Glaciation and volcanism were contemporaneous during the bimodal stratovolcano stage as shown by the existence of volcano-glacial deposits in the volcanic edifice.

Felsic dome-forming stage
By the Pliocene epoch, radially directed alpine glaciers had eroded away much of the bimodal stratovolcano, leaving behind a series of U-shaped valleys with intervening ridges that comprise the Level Mountain Range. This dissection of the bimodal stratovolcano was followed by the felsic dome-forming stage. Eruptions of felsic magma were predominantly viscous during this stage of activity, resulting in the magma piling up around volcanic vents to create a series of lava domes.

The felsic dome-forming stage extended over a timespan of two million years. Meszah Peak, the highest point of both Level Mountain and the Level Mountain Range, formed at the end of this stage 2.5 million years ago. Also emplaced at the end of this stage were comendite flows, ash flow tuffs and lava tubes.

Quaternary stage
The fourth and final stage of volcanism began on the summit of Level Mountain, depositing lava in and adjacent to the Level Mountain Range. This lava is indirectly dated as Pleistocene age, on the basis of the presence of intraglacial deposits. These deposits are in the form of pillow lavas, which were likely extruded into marginal glacial lakes high on the flanks of the mountain. More recent volcanic eruptions have been a topic of debate among scientists. Several small basaltic vents on the broad summit of Level Mountain were considered by T. S. Hamilton and C. M. Scafe (1977) to have formed during the Holocene epoch, although Holocene activity has been regarded as uncertain by B. R. Edwards and J. K. Russell (2000). These younger vents produced spatter cones, agglomerate and volcanic bombs, as well as trachybasalt, mugearite and hawaiite lava flows. Exposed on the south side of Level Mountain near Hatchau Lake is a rock outcrop consisting of boulders cemented together by calcareous sinter. This suggests an area of hot spring activity that may be related to volcanism at the mountain.

Two  tephra deposits, collectively known as the Finlay tephras, are situated between sand, silt, mud and gravel in the Dease Lake and Finlay River areas. They both range in composition from phonolitic to trachytic and are high in iron(II) oxide, indicating that the tephras were likely extruded from a single volcanic centre. Radiocarbon dating of terrestrial plant macrofossils directly overlying the youngest tephra deposit suggest an early Holocene age for this volcanic material. Because Level Mountain has received little scientific study, it is a possible source for these tephra deposits along with Hoodoo Mountain, Heart Peaks and the Mount Edziza volcanic complex.

Monitoring and volcanic hazards
Like other volcanic centres in the NCVP, Level Mountain is not monitored closely enough by the Geological Survey of Canada to ascertain its activity level. The Canadian National Seismograph Network has been established to monitor earthquakes throughout Canada, but it is too far away to provide an accurate indication of activity under the mountain. The seismograph network may sense an increase in seismic activity if Level Mountain becomes highly restless, but this may only provide a warning for a large eruption; the system might detect activity only once the mountain has started erupting. If Level Mountain were to erupt, mechanisms exist to orchestrate relief efforts. The Interagency Volcanic Event Notification Plan was created to outline the notification procedure of some of the main agencies that would respond to an erupting volcano in Canada, an eruption close to the Canada–United States border or any eruption that would affect Canada.

The lava plateau margins of Level Mountain are vulnerable to landslides. This is particularly true around the steep south and west boundaries where relatively clay-rich, incompetent layers of agglomerates and tuffs are present between more competent basaltic lava flows. Remnants of a  mudflow are present on the eastern slope of the Little Tahltan canyon. Similar older scars, including those in Beatty Creek, are visible around much of the lava plateau parameter. Past eruptions of Level Mountain may have altered drainage patterns of local streams but their actual effects remain unknown.

Geography

Background
Level Mountain is situated within the Boreal Mountains and Plateaus Ecoregion, a large ecological region in northwestern British Columbia encompassing high plateaus and rugged mountains with intervening lowlands. Boreal forests of black and white spruce occur in the lowlands and valley bottoms whereas birch, spruce and willow form forests on the mid-slopes. Extensive alpine Altai fescue covers the upper slopes but barren rock is abundant at higher elevations. A cold, dry boreal mountain climate characterizes this ecoregion. The Boreal Mountains and Plateaus Ecoregion is part of the Northern Boreal Mountains Ecoprovince which forms part of the Sub-Arctic Highlands Ecodivision.

The Boreal Mountains and Plateaus Ecoregion is subdivided into at least seven ecosections, the Stikine Plateau Ecosection being the main ecosection at Level Mountain. This ecosection consists of a partially dissected upland characterized by rounded ridges and wide valleys. It contains several small lakes, marshes, muskegs and streams, the latter of which drain into the Stikine River, Taku River and Liard River watersheds. Boreal black and white spruce are present in valley bottoms, black spruce being commonly found around wetlands such as muskegs. Level Mountain has been described as the most impressive feature in the Stikine Plateau Ecosection. It is one of the few locations in this ecosection where alpine vegetation can be found. Although alpine vegetation of the Stikine Plateau Ecosection can be lush and grass-rich above the tree line, wetlands and muskegs are the dominant ecosystems on Level Mountain.

Plants

Level Mountain is characterized by three biophysical zones. Lodgepole pine is associated with communities of kinnikinnick, bog birch, Altai fescue and moss. Mature white spruce and lodgepole pine forests dominate north of Level Mountain where bog birch occurs in river valley bottoms.

It is characterized by a harsh climate with wind, cold temperatures, snow and short growing seasons. Bog birch is the dominant vegetation, forming extremely large areas of continuous cover. Mature subalpine fir forests have been extensively burned by large wildfires and are now limited only to the northern flank of Level Mountain.

As a result, this region lacks trees because of its high altitude. The most common vegetation is Arctic bluegrass, dwarf willows, louseworts, Altai fescue, boreal mugwort and alpine lichens and mosses. Common plants on the sparsely vegetated slopes of the Level Mountain Range are sedges, prickly and alpine brook saxifrages, dwarf willows, moss campion, Arctic bluegrass and alpine lichens and mosses.

Animals
Several animal species inhabit Level Mountain, notably brown bears, wolves, long-tailed jaegers, caribou, mountain goats, ptarmigans, moose, long-tailed ducks and Stone sheep. Wolves occupy valleys and use the alpine areas for hunting and denning. Brown bears are common in the alpine and are potential predators of newborn caribou calves. The caribou at Level Mountain form a herd that is part of a larger population extending west of the Dease River and north of the Stikine River into Yukon. More than 400 caribou were identified at Level Mountain in 1978, although the Ministry of Environment and Parks considered the herd to be declining due to poor recruitment. By 1980, the caribou population was estimated to have been roughly 350. Level Mountain caribou is represented in the American Museum of Natural History as part of the Hall of North American Mammals.

Soils
A variety of soil types with differing physical properties are found at Level Mountain. Shallow, coarse, textured and steep to strongly sloping soils dominate peaks of the Level Mountain Range and owe their origin to weathering of volcanic rocks. These well-drained soils are strongly acidic and xeric in nature and show little or no horizon development. The gently undulating alpine portions of Level Mountain have been affected by cryoturbation, resulting in patterned ground in which coarse material has been separated from each other as patches or stripes. At lower elevations, soils develop on fluvioglacial deposits. Many of these fluvioglacial materials contain a high percentage of fine materials while the soils which have developed from them contain a subsurface horizon enriched by clay accumulation. Very poorly-drained organic soils are extensive on the southern portion of the lava plateau.

Climate
The climate of Level Mountain is influenced by the presence of the Coast Mountains to the west, which disrupt the flow of the prevailing westerly winds. This disruption causes the winds to drop most of their moisture onto the western slopes of the Coast Mountains before reaching the Nahlin Plateau, casting a rain shadow over Level Mountain. Because the mountain has a gently sloping and flat profile, it has subtle differences in climate, particularly at the low to upper-mid elevations. Therefore, a relatively homogeneous climate extends over Level Mountain; only gradual temperature and precipitation gradients occur altitudinally. As a result, large mammals do not have a wide diversity of local climates from which to choose.

Travel from high to low elevations below  in the winter can be difficult for some mammals due to the accumulation of snow. Above , exposure to local winds is improved and ridges of snow are cleared on steeper slopes. Wind speeds increase with elevation but the distribution of wind over the area is fairly uniform. Level Mountain experiences relatively light snowfall unlike the Coast Mountains.

During the late May and early June calving season, winds predominate from a southerly quadrant. Mixed rain and snow are common at that time of the year. Reduced air drainage, coupled with clear calm nights, lowers minimum temperatures in the summer, reducing the frost-free period.

Streams
Several tributaries of the Hackett, Nahlin, Tahltan and Tuya rivers originate from Level Mountain:

Human history

Occupation

In 1891–1892, the Hudson's Bay Company constructed a trail from the junction of the Sheslay and Hackett rivers to the southwestern slope of Level Mountain. Here, the company had built a trading post by 1898 named Egnell after its operator Albert Egnell. After spending one winter at the post, Egnell found that there was no trade to be done in the area and the post was subsequently abandoned. Egnell died on June 22, 1900, from an accidental gun shot to his leg by his son, McDonald, five days earlier and was buried at the Liard Post near the mouth of the Dease River.

In the early 1900s, the Egnell Post served as a repair station for the  Yukon Telegraph Line, which extended from Ashcroft, British Columbia, to Dawson City, Yukon. A small settlement consisting of a mission house and a number of other buildings had been established on the site by 1944. This settlement, named Sheslay, has since been abandoned. There is no human population within  of Level Mountain but more than 630 people live within .

Along the south side of Level Mountain are a number of other localities, including Hyland Ranch, Saloon, Salmon Creek Indian Reserve No. 3, Upper Tahltan Indian Reserve No. 4 and Tahltan Forks Indian Reserve No. 5. The northwestern side of Level Mountain is home to the Callison Ranch, which lies just east of Hatin Lake. Southeast of Level Mountain is the Days Ranch near the junction of the Tahltan and Stikine rivers. It was established by Ira Day in or before 1929 as a stopping place on the road from Dease Lake to Telegraph Creek. Day operated the ranch until he died around 1960, after which it remained abandoned for a time. In 2018, the Days Ranch was destroyed by a  wildfire; more than 30 structures were burned.

Geological studies
The large size and remote location of Level Mountain has limited geological studies at this volcanic complex. Basalt and andesite flows were presented in the 1926 Canada Department of Mines Summary Report, 1925, Part A. The andesites were described as porphyritic rocks with phenocrysts of feldspar of various size in a greyish or greenish matrix. Both hornblende and augite andesites were noted to have been represented under a microscope. The basalts were described as black rocks with basic plagioclase with or without olivine and were noted in many cases to contain a considerable percentage of brownish glass. Although there was not sufficient time available to study these flows in detail, it was revealed at several points that the andesites formed the older and the basalts the younger flows. G. M. Dawson of the Geological Survey of Canada was able to demonstrate that on the Stikine River there were at least four flows of basalt. The basalts and andesites were considered to be younger than all the rocks they were observed in contact with, namely granitic intrusives, porphyries and greenstones. More definitive evidence as to their age was obtained by W. A. Johnston and F. A. Kerr of the Geological Survey of Canada who placed them in the Tertiary. Some of the most recent lava flows of the Stikine valley were assigned as probably belonging to the Pleistocene.

Level Mountain was demonstrated in the 1920s as a possible source for the extensive lavas in the neighbouring Tuya volcanic field. This field, consisting of flat-topped summits or benches, was considered to have formed as a result of block faulting or by erosion of a formerly much more extensive surface underlain by horizontally bedded volcanic rocks. The possibility of Level Mountain being a source for the Tuya field lavas would deteriorate in the 1940s when Canadian volcanologist Bill Mathews revealed that the flat-topped, steep-sided summits were not products of faulting or erosion but were rather individual volcanoes formed by eruptions of lava into lakes thawed through an ice sheet. Mathews coined the term "tuya" for these subglacial volcanoes after Tuya Butte which is located in the Tuya volcanic field. The recognition of Level Mountain as a long-lived zone of volcanism in contrast to the small Tuya field volcanoes has given it status as a separate volcanic centre.

The mountain was identified by the mapping program of Operation Stikine in 1956. This program, masterminded by Canadian volcanologist Jack Souther, was carried out over the Stikine River area using a Bell helicopter. Reconnaissance mapping in 1962 by Jack Souther and Hu Gabrielse identified a sequence of lavas of late Tertiary to Quaternary age. Level Mountain was then studied by T. S. Hamilton in the 1970s who produced a detailed map and the first petrochemical study of the lavas. The andesites described in the 1920s were mapped as early Tertiary age, long before Level Mountain formed. Hamilton recognized the four distinctive stratigraphic units of the lava plateau, as well as the overlying bimodal package of alkali basalt and peralkaline lavas and tuffs.

In 1994, Carignnan et al. considered Level Mountain to be underlain by a mantle plume or hotspot due to its proximity to a major continental divide between the Yukon, Arctic and Pacific watersheds. The high 206Pb/204Pb ratios in Level Mountain basalt were used as isotopic evidence to support this theory. However, P-wave studies conducted in 1998 by Frederikson et al. did not detect any geophysical anomalies near the mountain to justify the existence of a mantle plume or hotspot.

Naming
The name of the mountain is a reference to its plateau surface. It was adopted by the Geographical Names Board of Canada on December 21, 1944, as identified in the Canada Department of Mines Summary Report, 1925, Part A. The name appeared on National Topographic System (NTS) map 104/NE but was replaced with the name Level Mountain Range on August 14, 1952, upon production of NTS map 104J. The reason for this name change was that cartographers were uncertain as to what the name Level Mountain referred to. They cited H. S. Bostock's 1948 report Physiography of the Canadian Cordillera, With Special Reference to the Area North of the Fifty-Fifth Parallel in which Bostock stated that Level Mountain was a small prominent mountain range on the Nahlin Plateau. Despite this misinterpretation, Level Mountain is still the local name for the entire volcanic edifice and the name Level Mountain Range for a group of steep peaks centered on the mountain's summit. Although the mountain appears level when viewed from a distance, it attains the shape of a large triangle when examined from the top of some of the high hills west of the bend of the Tuya River.

Accessibility

Level Mountain lies in a remote location with no established road access. The closest route to this major volcanic complex is a graded road from Dease Lake to Telegraph Creek, which extends within  of the mountain. From Telegraph Creek or Days Ranch the mountain may be reached by a  hike. Several small low-lying lakes surrounding Level Mountain provide float plane access, including Ketchum Lake, Hatin Lake and Granite Lake.

The Yukon Telegraph Trail, a historic pathway built in the 1890s, is still passable through Hatin Lake and provides an overland route to the shield volcano. Alternatively, fixed-wing aircraft landings can be made on a runway at Sheslay. Charter helicopter service in the small community of Dease Lake provides direct access to the Level Mountain Range. The alpine lava plateau of Level Mountain is easily travelled by horse or on foot during the snow-free period from June to September. Much of the area south of Level Mountain is impassable due to poorly-drained fens.

See also

 List of Northern Cordilleran volcanoes
 List of volcanoes in Canada
 Volcanism of Western Canada

Notes

References

Further reading

External links

 
 Level Mountain
 Level Mountain North
 Level Mountain S-E
 Level Mountain S-W

 
Miocene shield volcanoes
Miocene stratovolcanoes
Pliocene lava domes
Quaternary volcanoes
Shield volcanoes of Canada
Polygenetic shield volcanoes
Stratovolcanoes of Canada
Lava plateaus
Plateaus of British Columbia
Subglacial volcanoes of Canada
Two-thousanders of British Columbia
Cassiar Country